Sanzi (born in 1965 in Yangzhou, Jiangsu) is a widely recognized contemporary artist. Known for his mastery of deploying a combination of techniques including Western painting, traditional Chinese ink painting, metal, wood and porcelain works.

Heavily influenced by Taoism, he often signs his works with “Sanzi” (散子) which has the metaphysical meaning of “floating”, “freedom” and “humility”. Many of the subjects of his paintings reflect concepts of humanity and cosmos. The ideas described by Taoism as inaction (keeping things in their nature without interference), “The best of men is like water”, contemplation, and the universe, are often used in the themes of Sanzi's works. Sanzi's works are full of energy and inspiration. His artworks have a holy level and every audience has been deeply impressed. His artworks also inspire the audience and convey the artist's message, which believes that the most beautiful image in the world of God and humans is maintaining the most natural form. Every life is nourished by natural energy. Sanzi considers that the processes, meanings, and health of life are the parts that people should cherish and pursue in the process of discovering and pursuing different stages of life.

He gained recognition in 2005, and is now one of the well-known figures in contemporary Chinese art. He now resides in Suzhou.

Introduction
Sanzi's philosophy remark of "before the age of 40 is Confucianism and after the age of 40 is Taoism" has been deeply rooted and widely discussed. Sanzi ’s profound experience and insights in life ultimately made him choose using “Chuang Tzu philosophy” as his creative theme. Many confidant collectors were attracted by his unique expression skills and the aesthetic beauty of the artworks. His artworks have been dealt with more than one million RMB by famous auction companies such as London "Bonhams" and Beijing "Poly Auction". Wikipedia, Baidu Baike, Google, etc. also have Sanzi's classics.

Furthermore, Sanzi was the only Chinese artist currently represented by Taglialatella Galleries in the United States. The internationally acclaimed pop artists Andy Warhol, Jeff Koons, and the nostalgic artist Andrew-Wyeth are also from this gallery (when Picasso first arrived in New York also in cooperation with this gallery).

At the Art Basel Miami Art Fair held in December 2011, Sanzi's works were displayed on the same stage with works by Andy Warhol, Jeff Koons, Andrew-Wyeth and other works, and received strong responses from the audiences and plenty of well-known mainstream media. Sanzi has set a precedent for promoting the international recognition of Chinese Taoist culture in the form of painting.

Early life
His father was from Yangzhou, Jiangsu and mother from Pingxiang, Jiangxi. He was an only child and shortly after his second birthday, his father died. The widowed mother, already 46 years old, brought him up despite many hardships, with enduring love and affection. In the middle of the Cultural Revolution, as an intellectual, she became jobless and had to move home repeatedly to make the ends meet.

As a child, he was quiet, serious and often wrapped up in his own world of thoughts. Observing the hardships imposed on his mother through frequent moving, he later adopted the tag name “Sanzi”.

Whilst living in the countryside of Hunan during his elementary and middle school years, a traditional Chinese artist was his neighbor. He developed a great affection for Xiaolong, he tutored and encouraged him to study art. This apprenticeship ended in the early 1980s, when his mother resumed full-time employment after the Cultural Revolution and took Xiaolong to Changsha City, Hunan.

Changsha: Studying and teaching
In 1983, Sanzi enrolled in the Fine Arts Institute of Hunan Normal University in Changsha. There he studied traditional Chinese ink painting, calligraphy, as well as European oil painting and sculpture. After graduation, he was granted a post-graduate research scholarship and was also assigned to teach newly enrolled students. Soon after he was also gained entry to the Hunan Academy of Art.

During this period, he started experimenting with paint and design using multi-media and mixed-techniques, influenced by Conceptual Art and Post-Modernism. The subjects of this work included landscape, figures, and occasionally still life. He also designed clocks, which incorporated both wood carving and metalwork.

In 1997, he left the old city of Changsha to move to the booming metropolis of Shenzhen, in search of inspiration, as well as the opportunity to exhibit his work.

Beginning his Career

However upon arrival in Shenzhen, he found his attempts to exhibit his work frustrated; boom time Shenzhen society was engrossed in fast money and commerce, not art. In addition, his unconventional approach to art and design set him apart from traditional Chinese work and was not appreciated by the few local art dealers.

After repeated rejection and out of increasing desperation, he decided that his only choice was to promote his works himself. During the year 2000, Sanzi's works increasingly came to the attention of private European collectors who appreciated the uniqueness of his art. This brought him both recognition and the funding necessary for his later, larger-scale solo exhibitions and promotions.

Late 1990s to 2007

During the late 1990s to 2007, the subjects of his paintings were increasingly centered around Taoism. In parallel, he created the first female figurative series, and named the series "Summer".

The works in this period are often rendered in shades of pale grey, light gold, white and egg blue.

He also produced a series of conceptual landscapes later in this period, where the influence of surrealism and cubism can be clearly observed. These landscapes are appreciated as something of a rarity. He signed his works in this period with his full name, with either Chinese characters or Pinyin.

2008 Sanzi Studio
In early 2008, a few pieces of his work were exhibited in Hong Kong with the assistance of a private curator, which introduced his works to the upper echelons of Hong Kong business. He was contracted to work with the interior design of high-profile architecture projects, including the Bank of China Hong Kong Office.

These projects occupied most of his time outside the studio, and the frequent traveling replayed his childhood. 

During this period, his works took on more intense colors such as fiery browns and bright oranges, although the iconic Taoism figures remained intact.

Shanghai
In the middle of 2009, he moved to Shanghai continuing under the name “Sanzi Studio”. This move brought Sanzi an enormous amount of exhibition and commercial opportunities.

Sanzi Studio participated in the 13th Edition (2009) of the Shanghai Art Fair, which "enjoys quite an impact worldwide and evolves as a famous Asia's celebrated art exchange".

He started to get attention from the upper echelons of Shanghai in property development, business, and the banking industry. They sought after him to host his exhibitions. Often these commercial entities have linkages in Beijing, Hong Kong, and Europe, which further extended his reputation.

In November 2009, he had a solo Exhibition "Artishop • Sanzi • Charity" in Hong Kong, he was visited for the first time by the British auction house Bonhams. The proceedings of the exhibition were used to start the charity “Sanzi Funding” whose primary aim is to provide educational funding for impoverished children.

July 2010, he had another solo exhibition in Shanghai, sponsored by Hang Seng Bank, at Zendai Contemporary Art Exhibition Hall, part of the Zendai Group. In addition to works themed Taoism, he also introduced his latest progress in Abstract Art.

SANZI ART GALLERY
On November 23 (local time in the United States), Sanzi Art Gallery grandly opens at Laguna Beach, Los Angeles.

Sanzi Art Gallery has set up in Shanghai and Beijing as well as in Singapore and Kuala Lumpur. There also have special cooperation institutions in New York and Miami in the United States. This is the first time to set up a special exhibition hall for the artworks of Sanzi in Laguna, Los Angeles.

International fame 
Sanzi has traveled to Hong Kong, New York, Paris, and many other artistic cities and now settles down in Shanghai. He has held large-scale personal work exhibitions in Hong Kong, Shanghai, Miami, New York, Taipei, Singapore, Kuala Lumpur, etc., and several well-known mainstream media made special reports and interviews on Mr. Sanzi and his personal exhibitions. His exclusive artwork is currently represented by the famous galleries－Art WeMe Contemporary Gallery in California, Malaysia & Singapore. With his rising popularity, he was ordered to create one background painting for China Pavilion during the Shanghai Expo in 2010.

Selected Solo Exhibitions

Solo Exhibition, Hong Kong, 2009

Solo Exhibition, Shanghai, 2009 - 2010

Basel Art Exhibition, 2011

Solo Exhibition in New York, 2012

Art Revolution Taipei, 2013

Asia Contemporary Art Show, Hong Kong, 2013

Art Expo Malaysia, 2013

Art Revolution Taipei, 2014

Solo Exhibition, Art Busan, 2014

Art Expo Malaysia, 2014

Solo Exhibition, Art Stage Singapore, 2015

Art Expo Malaysia 2015

Singapore Contemporary Art Show, 2016

SANZI ART GALLERY, Los Angeles, 2019

Auctions 
Auctioned for the first time by the renowned London Auction House, Bonhams in the United Kingdom, 2011

Spring Auction by the renowned Beijing Poly International Auction in Beijing, China, 2013

Fall Auctioned by China Guardian Auction, China, 2013

Museum Collections 
荷香 Hexiang (Fragrance of Lotus), Shenzhen Museum

七贤 Qixian (7 Nobelities) is kept in Shanghai World Expo Hall

References

External links
 Personal Photo Gallery Sina.com

1965 births
Chinese designers
Chinese contemporary artists
Living people
Painters from Yangzhou